The Central Michigan Chippewas softball team represents Central Michigan University in NCAA Division I college softball.  The team participates in the Mid-American Conference. The Chippewas are currently led by head coach McCall Salmon. The team plays its home games at Margo Jonker Stadium located on the university's campus.

History

Coaching history

Coaching staff

References